Hollandsche Rading is a Dutch railway station located along the railway line Hilversum - Utrecht, near the town of Hollandsche Rading and immediately west of the A27 motorway. The station was opened on 1 June 1885.

The railway station is located exactly on the border of two provinces. Platform 1, for the southbound trains (Utrecht-bound), lies in the province of Utrecht, while platform 2, for the northbound (Hilversum-bound) trains, is located in North Holland.

Hollandsche Rading can be translated in Dutch to Holland Border as in North Holland going into Utrecht.

Train services

Bus services

Note: The bus stop is located close to the station, but is called Vuurse Dreef.

Gallery

References

External links
NS website 
Dutch Public Transport journey planner 

Railway stations in Utrecht (province)
Railway stations in North Holland
Railway stations opened in 1874
De Bilt